Adilly is a commune in the Deux-Sèvres department in the Nouvelle-Aquitaine region in western France.

The commune of Adilly has joined together with 38 neighbouring communes to establish the Communauté de communes de Parthenay-Gâtine which provides a framework within which local tasks are carried out together.

Population

See also
Communes of the Deux-Sèvres department

References

Communes of Deux-Sèvres